The Ballagh or Ballaghkeen is a village in the southeastern corner of Ireland. It is situated in County Wexford just off the R741 regional road halfway between the towns of Gorey to the north and Wexford to the south. As of the 2016 census, the village had a population of 515 people.

Sport 
Oulart the Ballagh is the local Gaelic Athletic Association club. As reflected in the name, the club takes players from The Ballagh and the nearby village of Oulart. The club has won the Wexford Senior Hurling Championship on 13 occasions, most recently in 2016.

In March 2012, Oulart the Ballagh won the All-Ireland Senior Club Camogie Championship.

In addition, The Ballagh has a boxing club where the Olympian Adam Nolan first trained.

Amenities 

The village contains a local school, church, community centre and health clinic, along with two pubs (one with a shop) and a post office/shop. A mile outside the village there is a coillte forest which has walking trails. 

About 1 km east of the village is part of the medieval road which linked Wexford to Dublin. In reality, if someone needed to get between these two ports before the Great Famine, they went by ship. This road went into decline when the R741, known locally as 'the new line', was built a few decades after the 1798 Rising. The R741 was built wider, straighter and leveller so that troops could be moved quickly to this area in the event of another insurrection. The crown forces discovered that the existing road was not suited to moving troops safely or quickly.

The medieval road provides a walkway and has hedgerows and views towards St George's Channel.

Demographics 
Between the 2011 and 2016 census, the population of The Ballagh increased from 477 to 515 people. Around this time, a number of new housing estates were developed (or planned to be developed) within the periphery of the village.

References

Towns and villages in County Wexford